Thomas Somers (7 April 1909 – 17 March 1984) was a British sailor. He competed in the Dragon event at the 1952 Summer Olympics sailing Sabre, Dragon Sail Number K215, Camper and Nicholsons yard number 750.

References

External links
 

1909 births
1984 deaths
British male sailors (sport)
Olympic sailors of Great Britain
Sailors at the 1952 Summer Olympics – Dragon
Sportspeople from Dudley